The Heilbronner Block is a historic commercial building located in downtown Hood River, Oregon, United States.

The building was listed on the National Register of Historic Places 2006.

See also

National Register of Historic Places listings in Hood River County, Oregon

References

External links

1910 establishments in Oregon
Buildings and structures completed in 1910
Buildings and structures in Hood River, Oregon
Chicago school architecture in Oregon
National Register of Historic Places in Hood River County, Oregon